Jeanne Merkus (Batavia, 11 October 1839 – Utrecht, 1 February, 1897), was a Dutch deaconess, guerilla soldier, and political activist.

She was an educated deaconess and worked tending the wounded in Paris during the Franco-Prussian War.

Between 1873 and 1876, she was a member of the Christian rebel guerilla of Mićo Ljubibratić and participated in fighting the Ottoman Empire in Herzegovina, dressed as a male soldier and leading soldiers in battle.

She served by organizing the army medical service on the Serbian side during the Serbian–Turkish Wars (1876–1878).

She was famous in the contemporary international press and referred to as the "Joan of Arc of the Balkans".

References 

1839 births
1897 deaths
Deaconesses
Women in 19th-century warfare
Women in European warfare
People of the Franco-Prussian War
Serbian–Turkish Wars (1876–1878)
19th-century rebels
19th-century Dutch women
Dutch clergy